Scutellastra is a genus of sea snails with gills, typical true limpets, marine gastropod molluscs in the family Patellidae, the true limpets.

In Branch et al. 2002, Scutellastra is mentioned as a genus while according to Vaught it is actually a subgenus. All species listed in Branch et al. as belonging to the genus of Scutellastra were not entered into the database under this genus, but were directly placed under Patella (Scutellastra) - being the right taxonomic classification according to Vaught.

Species
Species within the genus Scutellastra include:
 Scutellastra aphanes (Robson, 1986)
 Scutellastra argenvillei (Krauss, 1848)
 † Scutellastra aurorae (C. A. Fleming, 1973) 
 Scutellastra barbara (Linnaeus, 1758)
 Scutellastra chapmani (Tenison-Woods, 1875)
 Scutellastra cochlear (Born, 1778)
 † Scutellastra cooperi Powell, 1938 
 Scutellastra exusta (Reeve, 1854)
 Scutellastra flexuosa (Quoy & Gaimard, 1834)
 Scutellastra granularis (Linnaeus, 1758)
 Scutellastra kermadecensis (Pilsbry, 1894)
 Scutellastra laticostata (Blainville, 1825)
 Scutellastra longicosta (Lamarck, 1819)
 Scutellastra mexicana (Broderip & G.B. Sowerby I, 1829)
 Scutellastra miliaris (Philippi, 1848)
 Scutellastra natalensis (F. Krauss, 1848)
 Scutellastra obtecta (Krauss, 1848)
 Scutellastra optima (Pilsbry, 1927)
 Scutellastra peronii (Blainville, 1825)
 Scutellastra tabularis (Krauss, 1848)
 Scutellastra tucopiana Powell, 1925
Species brought into synonymy
 Scutellastra pica (Reeve, 1854): synonym of Scutellastra exusta (Reeve, 1854)

References

 Vaught, K.C. (1989). A classification of the living Mollusca. American Malacologists: Melbourne, FL (USA). . XII, 195 pp.
 BRANCH M.L., GRIFFITHS C.L., KENSLEY B., SIEG J. 1991. The benthic Crustacea of subantarctic Marion and Prince Edward Islands: Illustrated keys to the species and results of the 1982-1989 University of Cape Town Surveys. South African Journal of Antarctic Research, 21(1): 3-44.

External links
 Adams, H. & Adams, A. (1853-1858). The genera of Recent Mollusca; arranged according to their organization. London, van Voorst. Vol. 1: xl + 484 pp.; vol. 2: 661 pp.; vol. 3: 138 pls.
 Dall, W. H. (1871). Preliminary sketch of a natural arrangement of the order Docoglossa. Proceedings of the Boston Society of Natural History. 14: 49-54
 Iredale, T. (1924). Results from Roy Bell's molluscan collections. Proceedings of the Linnean Society of New South Wales. 49(3): 179-278
 Iredale, T. (1929). Queensland molluscan notes, No. 1. Memoirs of the Queensland Museum. 9(3): 261-297, pls 30-31

Patellidae
Gastropod genera
Taxa named by Arthur Adams (zoologist)
Taxa named by Henry Adams (zoologist)